Robert Nippoldt (born 1977 in Kranenburg, Germany) is a German illustrator, graphic designer and book artist.
He studied graphic design and illustration at the University of Applied Sciences in Münster. The book “Gangster. Die Bosse von Chicago” was his thesis project. Two years later in 2007, his second book “Jazz. New York in the Roaring Twenties” was published. It was translated into several languages and won numerous awards. In 2010 “Hollywood in the 1930s”, his third book on 1920s and 30s America, came out. In 2017 his fourth book “Night falls on the Berlin of the Roaring Twenties” was published. His books are accompanied by games and limited edition silkscreen prints.
In addition to his book projects, he illustrates for international magazines and clients including The New Yorker, Le Monde, Die ZEIT, Mercedes-Benz, Reader’s Digest, Taschen and TIME Magazine.
For commissions of this nature he collaborates with his sister Astrid Nippoldt and his wife, Christine Nippoldt, as part of their own label, Studio Nippoldt.

"Ein Rätselhafter Schimmer“ is the accompanying show to the Berlin book. The stage programme with live drawings and live music was developed in 2015-2018 by Robert Nippoldt and the „Trio Größenwahn“. The show has been performed more than 50 times, among others in the Pantheon-Theater in Bonn, at Berlin Heimathafen, at Schloss Elmau, at Kurhaus Göggingen and on the cruise ships of AIDA.

Robert Nippoldt’s works have been shown in exhibitions in Germany, Switzerland, Belgium and Spain. His studio is located at the old freight yard in Münster.

Publications 

 
 Gangster. Die Bosse von Chicago, Gerstenberg Verlag, Hildesheim 2005. 
 Jazz. New York in the Roaring Twenties with Hans-Jürgen Schaal (text), TASCHEN 2013, 
 Hollywood in the Thirties with Daniel Kothenschulte (concept, text) and Christine Goppel (coloration), TASCHEN, 2013, 
 The Great Transformation: Climate – Can we beat the Heat with Christine Goppel, Jörg Hartmann, Jörg Hülsmann, Astrid Nippoldt and Iris Ugurel, published by A. Hamann, C. Zea-Schmidt and Reinhold Leinfelder, WBGU, Berlin 2014. 
 Night Falls on the Berlin of the Roaring Twenties with Boris Pofalla (text), TASCHEN 2017,

Awards 
 iF Design Award for “Berlin”, 2019, Hannover
 German Design Award for “Berlin”, 2019, Frankfurt
 Best Book Award for “Berlin”, 2018, Los Angeles
 Berliner Type Award for “Berlin”, 2018, Berlin
 red dot design award for “Berlin”, 2018, Essen
 ADC Award for “Berlin”, 2018, Berlin
 Joseph Binder Award for “Berlin”, 2018, Vienna
 International Creative Media Award for “Berlin”, 2018, Meerbusch
 Movie book of the month, Hans Helmut Prinzler, for “Berlin”, January 2018, Berlin
 German Design Award for “Jazz”, 2016, Frankfurt
 Best American Infographic for “Facemap” in “Hollywood”, 2015, New York
 International Book Award for “Jazz”, 2014, Los Angeles
 Good Design Award for “Jazz”, 2014, Chicago
 Joseph Binder Award for “Jazz”, 2014, Vienna
 A' Design Award for “Jazz”, 2014, Como
 D&AD, Award for “Jazz”, 2014, London
 Best American Infographic for “The Recording Sessions – Sociogram” in “Jazz”, 2014, New York
 International Design Award for “Jazz”, 2013, Los Angeles
 German Designer Club Award for “Hollywood”, 2011, Frankfurt
 red dot design award for “Hollywood”, 2011, Essen
 Movie book of the year, Hans Helmut Prinzler for “Hollywood”, 2010, Berlin
 European Design Award for layout for “Jazz”, 2008, Stockholm
 Stiftung Buchkunst “The most beautiful german book 2007” for “Jazz”, 2007, Frankfurt
 Illustrative: “One of the most wonderful books in Europe” for “Jazz”, 2007, Berlin
 red dot design award for “Gangster”, 2006, Essen

External links 
 Works by or about Robert Nippoldt in the German National Library
 Official Website of Robert Nippoldt

References 

1977 births
Living people
People from Kleve (district)
German illustrators
German designers
German graphic designers
Information graphic designers
German typographers and type designers
Artists from North Rhine-Westphalia